Devoleena Bhattacharjee (born 22 August 1985) is an Indian television actress and trained Bharatanatyam dancer. She is known for playing Gopi Modi in StarPlus's long-running popular show Saath Nibhaana Saathiya. She also participated in Bigg Boss 13, Bigg Boss 14 and Bigg Boss 15.

Early life 
Bhattacharjee was born on 22 August 1985 to an Assamese-Bengali family in Upper Assam. She lives in Gurugram with her mother and her younger brother.

She did her schooling from Godhula Brown Memorial English High School in Sivasagar, Assam and her higher studies from the National Institute of Fashion and Technology in New Delhi, India.

Career 
A trained Bharatnatyam dancer, Bhattacharjee initially worked as a jewellery designer in Gili India Ltd. in Mumbai and was first noticed when she auditioned for dance reality series Dance India Dance 2. Her acting debut through NDTV Imagine's Sawaare Sabke Sapne Preeto occurred in 2011.

thumb|250px| Devoleena in 2015

In June 2012, Bhattacharjee replaced Giaa Manek as the female lead Gopi Ahem Modi in Star Plus's Saath Nibhaana Saathiya which turned out to be her breakthrough. In 2014 and in 2016, she contemplated quitting the show due to the frequent time leaps, but continued the character before completing 5 years in June 2017. The same month, she underwent spinal surgery for an injury that took place on the show's set in 2013. Saath Nibhaana Saathiya ended on 23 July 2017.

Bhattacharjee next joined as a celebrity contestant in 13th season of the reality TV show Bigg Boss that started in the last week of September 2019. However two months later in November 2019, she exited the show citing medical issues.

In August 2020, it was announced that Bhattacharjee will reprise the role of Gopi Modi in the sequel of Saath Nibhaana Saathiya, entitled Saath Nibhaana Saathiya 2 that begun airing on 19 October 2020. She was seen in the first 31 episodes with the last episode was telecasted on 23 November 2020.
 
She entered Bigg Boss 14 as a proxy contestant for Eijaz Khan. She also later entered Bigg Boss 15 as a wild card contestant, thus making history for appearing as contestant in 3 different seasons of Bigg Boss alongside Rakhi Sawant and Rahul Mahajan.

In June 2022, just after her movie first second chance, she returned to Saath Nibhaana Saathiya 2, to help Gehna resolve her family issues, and to celebrate her 10 year anniversary of being part of Saath Nibhaana Saathiya.

Filmography

Television

Special appearances

Web series

Music videos

Awards and nominations

References

External links

 

 

Living people
1985 births
People from Sivasagar district
Actresses from Assam
Dancers from Assam
Indian television actresses
Indian soap opera actresses
Indian web series actresses
Actresses in Hindi television
Bigg Boss (Hindi TV series) contestants
Bharatanatyam exponents
National Institute of Fashion Technology alumni
21st-century Indian dancers
21st-century Indian actresses